Simon Holland (27 September 1940 – 13 November 2010) was a British production designer.

Selected filmography
 Bartleby (1970)
 Swallows and Amazons (1974)
 Rosebud (1975)
 Equus (1977)
 The Shout (1978)
 Agatha (1979)
 Reds (1981)
 The Emerald Forest (1985)
 The Believers (1987)
 Buster (1988)
 Scandal (1989)
 Nuns on the Run (1990)
 King Ralph (1991)
 Where Angels Fear to Tread (1991)
 Decadence (1994)
 Swept from the Sea (1997)
 Captain Jack (1999)
 The Sleeping Dictionary (2003)
 The Adventures of Greyfriars Bobby (2005)

References

Bibliography 
 Hoyle, Brian. The Cinema of John Boorman. Scarecrow Press, 2012.
 Fisher, Lucy. Art Direction and Production Design. Rutgers University Press, 2015.

External links 
 
 https://www.bafta.org/heritage/in-memory-of/simon-holland

1940 births
2010 deaths
British production designers